Sir Stephen Wall  (born January 1947) is a retired British diplomat who served as Britain's ambassador to Portugal and Permanent Representative to the European Union.

Biography
Wall, who was educated at Douai School and Selwyn College, Cambridge, entered the Diplomatic Service in 1968. His early postings included the United Nations, Addis Ababa and Paris. On his return to London in 1974, he worked in the Foreign Office News Department and was later seconded to the press office of James Callaghan, who was then Prime Minister. He subsequently served as Assistant Private Secretary to David Owen, the Foreign Secretary and Lord Carrington, David Owen's successor.

Wall spent four years at the British Embassy, Washington, D.C. from 1979 to 1983, when he returned to the Foreign Office. From 1983 to 1988 he served as Assistant Head, and later Head, of the Foreign Office's European Community Department (Internal.) He was Private Secretary to the Foreign Secretary from 1988 to 1991, serving under Geoffrey Howe, John Major and Douglas Hurd. He was Private Secretary to Prime Minister John Major from 1991 to 1993, responsible for foreign policy and defence issues.

Wall was sent as Ambassador to Portugal in 1993, and he remained there until 1995, when he was named as Britain's Permanent Representative to the European Union. He returned to London in 2000 to takes charge of the Cabinet Office's European Secretariat. He remained in that post until 2004, and during that period he was EU adviser to Tony Blair. He was named as principal adviser to Cormac Murphy-O'Connor, the Roman Catholic Archbishop of Westminster in June 2004, and he served until June 2005.

From 2009 to 2019 Sir Stephen Wall was chairman of Cumberland Lodge, an educational charity initiating fresh debate on the burning questions facing society. From 2005 to 2014, he was a Council Member at UCL and was Council Chair from 2008 to 2014. He was Chair of the pro-EU 'Federal Trust' from 2010 to 2020.

From 2009 to 2014 he was co-chair of the Belgo-British Conference.

He is Chair of The Kaleidoscope Trust Board – a charity campaigning for LGBT rights overseas. He has worked as an Official Historian at the Cabinet Office, writing the Official History of Britain's relationship with the rest of the European Union.

Personal life
Wall was married with one son. In 2014, Stephen Wall came out publicly as homosexual. He divorced in 2014. In 2019, he married Dr Edward Sumner. He was Equalities Champion at UCL for LGBT+ issues. He said that reading Richard Dawkins' The God Delusion led him to abandon Catholicism.

Bibliography
A Stranger in Europe: Britain and the EU from Thatcher to Blair (OUP 2008)
 "The Official History of Britain and the European Community, Volume II: From Rejection to Referendum,1963 – 1975" (Routledge 2012); and Volume III: 'The Tiger Unleashed,1975 – 1985" ( Routledge 2018)

Offices held

References

1947 births
Living people
British Roman Catholics
Knights Grand Cross of the Order of St Michael and St George
Lieutenants of the Royal Victorian Order
People educated at Douai School
Alumni of Selwyn College, Cambridge
Ambassadors of the United Kingdom to Portugal
Permanent Representatives of the United Kingdom to the European Union
Recipients of the Order of the Cross of Terra Mariana, 3rd Class
Principal Private Secretaries to the Secretary of State for Foreign and Commonwealth Affairs
Members of HM Diplomatic Service
European Union and European integration scholars
British LGBT civil servants
Gay diplomats
20th-century British diplomats